Glasgow Roller Derby is a flat track roller derby league in Glasgow, Scotland. Founded in 2007, the league consists of two travel teams, three home teams and a skater training course for players and referees. Glasgow is a member of the United Kingdom Roller Derby Association (UKRDA), and the Women's Flat Track Derby Association (WFTDA).

The league has taken part in international competition, most notably the WFTDA Division 1 Playoff in Jacksonville, Florida in 2015, eventually coming in ninth place. Also in 2015, Glasgow Roller Derby were Tier 1 winners at the British Roller Derby Championships. Skaters from the league have featured in Team Ireland Roller Derby and Team Scotland Roller Derby.

League Structure

Travel Teams 
The three travel teams have names inspired by the popular Scottish carbonated beverage, Irn-Bru:

 Irn Bruisers (A, first game 2008)
 Maiden Grrders (B, first game 2009)
 Cannie Gingers (C, active 2014-2015)

Home Teams 
The three currently active home teams play in intra-league tournaments to give newer players the chance to try out their skills in front of an audience in a lower stakes environment than a game against another team, and promotes healthy competition between players:

 Bad Omens (established 2011)
 Death Stars (established 2011)
 Tyrannosaurus Wrecks (established 2013)
 Hell's Belles (2010-2014, currently inactive)

Glasgow Roller Recruits 
The Glasgow Roller Recruits (GRR) are Glasgow Roller Derby’s newest skaters. The league runs an intensive skating course three times a year to teach the skills needed to play or referee roller derby safely, and move up from Glasgow Roller Recruits to the main league.

To be eligible, all participants must be over 18. To graduate to league as a player, skaters must fit into the WFTDA gender statement. Skating officials can be any gender, as can non-skating officials (NSOs) and other league volunteers.

League History

Established by Teri Toxic and Mistress Malicious in February 2007 as the Glasgow Roller Girls, the first training session was held in April of the same year. Glasgow was the first roller derby league in Scotland, and fourth in the United Kingdom after London Rollergirls, Birmingham Blitz Dames and London Rockin’ Rollers.

Training sessions initially took place outdoors in Kelvingrove Park in less-than ideal Glaswegian weather conditions, thereafter moving to a regular slot at Glasgow Caledonian University. This has been their main training and game venue ever since.

The league's first bout was in March 2008, with the Irn Bruisers facing up to London Rollergirls’ All-Star A-team, London Brawling. Later that same year, the Irn Bruisers hosted the first transatlantic match, against an early iteration of Team Canada.

In 2009, the Irn Bruisers participated in the first ever European roller derby tournament, Roll Britannia, hosted at Earl’s Court by London Rollergirls. In September, Glasgow Roller Girls gained a B-team, the Maiden Grrders who played their first game against Auld Reekie Roller Derby’s B-team.

Glasgow Roller Derby’s Irn Bruisers and Maiden Grrders came in first and third positions respectively in the first Scottish roller derby tournament, Highland Fling, in 2010. In that same year, the first home teams competition was planned and Hell’s Belles came into being, closely followed by Bad Omens and Death Stars. The league was also involved in the inception of the UK Roller Derby Association, becoming one of its first members in June 2010.

In July 2011, Glasgow Roller Girls were accepted as a Women's Flat Track Derby Association Apprentice league, graduating as a full member the following June.

The league rebranded in early 2012, with a name change to Glasgow Roller Derby as well as a new logo and colour scheme. GRD hosted their first tournament, Chaos on the Clyde, featuring teams from all over the UK as well as Stuttgart.

Glasgow Roller Derby is a passionate advocate for LGBT inclusion in sport, with two league members having previously acted as the Transgender Liaison for the UK Roller Derby Association, Jodie Stanley and Freyja Gosnold.

In 2015, Glasgow qualified for the WFTDA International Playoffs for the first time, entering the Division 1 Playoff in Jacksonville, Florida as the seventh seed.  All the hard work paid off as Glasgow were the Tier 1 winner at the British Roller Derby Championships 2015.

For their 10th anniversary, Glasgow Roller Derby hosted a big birthday bash with three games – Rising Stars Women, Advanced Women, and Co-ed – as well as face painting, a roller disco and the afterparty.

National Team Representation

Glasgow Roller Derby players, coaches and referees have performed at the highest levels and have often been selected to represent their countries in the Roller Derby World Cup.

For the 2011 Roller Derby World Cup, Betty Gogo, Lily Lethal, Marla Mayhem, Marshall Lawless, Mistress Malicious, Viper, Whiskey Galore and Wild Oates were selected for the Team Scotland roster.

Chemikill Hazard and Coco Pox played for Team Ireland Roller Derby in 2011, with Chemikill Hazard returning for the 2014 Roller Derby World Cup team accompanied by Sarah McMillan.

Jess E. Ska, Mona Rampage, Rogue Runner, Splat and Suffra Jet joined returning player Marshall Lawless for the Team Scotland lineup in 2014.

The 2018 Roller Derby World Cup Team Scotland roster saw Devil’s Advoskate, Phoenix Fatale and Shorty McLightningpants keeping returning skater Mona Rampage company.

WFTDA competition
In 2015, Glasgow qualified for Playoffs for the first time, entering the Division 1 Playoff in Jacksonville, Florida as the seventh seed. After losses of 184-159 to Charlottesville Derby Dames and 284-100 to Tampa Roller Derby, Glasgow rebounded to win the ninth place game against Pikes Peak Derby Dames, 247-153.

Rankings

*Please note that rankings were suspended in March 2020 in light of the COVID-19 pandemic.

Five Nations Roller Derby Championships 
Glasgow have participated in the Women Tier 1 Premier division of the Five Nations Roller Derby Championships (renamed in 2021 from the British Roller Derby Championships) on three occasions since 2015.

They were dominant in 2015, winning all of their games to win championships. They beat Middlesbrough Milk Rollers 205-119, Auld Reekie Roller Derby 206-90, Tiger Bay Brawlers 280-54, Rainy City Roller Derby 267-79 and Central City Rollergirls 205-109.

GRD had less of an easy time of it in 2016, losing 198-122 to Leeds Roller Derby, 238-109 to Newcastle Roller Derby and 164-210 to London Roller Derby Brawl Saints (B), but managed to win against Royal Windsor Roller Derby 203-179.

In 2018, the league struggled at their previous level and lost all their games, 311-66 to Central City Roller Derby, 267-132 to London Rockin' Rollers and 112-274 to Liverpool Roller Birds.

Glasgow took time out to regroup in 2019 and didn't compete in the Championships that year.

Results of Public Games

All available results for public games are shown below. The league does sometimes host 'closed door' games, the results of which are excluded from this list.

 indicate a win, whilst  indicates a loss.

Irn Bruisers

Maiden Grrders

Cannie Gingers 
The Cannie Gingers were Glasgow Roller Derby's short-lived C team, active from early 2014 to late 2015.

References

Roller derby in Scotland
Roller derby leagues in the United Kingdom
Sports competitions in Glasgow
Roller derby leagues established in 2007
Women's sports teams in Scotland
Roller derby leagues in Scotland
2007 establishments in Scotland
Sport in Glasgow